Labor Order - state award of the Republic of Azerbaijan. The Order was ratified by legislation of the republic of Azerbaijan by the Decree  № 428-VQD on November 22, 2016.

Status 
The Order of Labor of the Republic of Azerbaijan awards the citizens of the Republic of Azerbaijan, foreigners and stateless persons for their labor achievements aimed at the development and welfare of the Republic of Azerbaijan in any field of activity.

These citizens are awarded this Order for long-term productive work in industry, agriculture, construction, transport, trade, crafts, services and other areas, with outstanding achievements in science, education, health, culture, physical education, sports and other fields.

This award is also awarded for productivity in production and improvement of product quality, high-quality production, continuous, efficient use of new techniques, technology, inventions and rationalization proposals.

There are three degrees of the Order of Labor of the Republic of Azerbaijan. The Order of Labor of the Republic of Azerbaijan is the highest rank. Ranks of the Order of Labor of the Republic of Azerbaijan are consecutively awarded.

Awarded by 
The “Labor” Order of the Republic of Azerbaijan is awarded by the relevant executive authority. .

Description of the Labor Order 
The Order of Labor of the Republic of Azerbaijan is placed on the left side of the breast after the Order "For service to the motherland", if there are other orders and medals of the Republic of Azerbaijan. The Labor Order consists of a full crescent with eight octagonal stars inside (each with a symbol of fire). The first degree of the order is made of gold, the second degree is silver, the third degree is bronze.

The outer diameter of the crescent is 38 mm and the inner diameter is 30 mm. In the center of the lower part of the crescent there is a word "ƏMƏK"  along the circle.

On the octagonal star with a flame symbol for each corner national ornaments are engraved. Relief patterns are engraved on the eight-pointed star. The eight-pointed stars outer surface is protuberant. The thickness of the order is 4 mm. The back of the order has a smooth surface. On the center of the star there is a series and number of the award.

Recipients

I Class 

 Ogtay Haziyev- builder, the village of Jojug Marjanli of the Jabrayil district 
 Khoshbakht Yusufzade  - first vice president of the State Oil Company of Azerbaijan (SOCAR)
 Fatma Huseynova - cotton grower, the village of Karatepe, Sabirabad district. Hero of Socialist Labor.
 Tofig Ismayilov - cotton grower, Yeni Karadolak village, Agjabadi district 
 Fazil Musayev - director of the agricultural cooperative “Agjabadi Innovation” 
 Tahir Salahov - artist, people's artist of the USSR, Hero of Socialist Labor 
 Shamsaddin Khan-Babayev – head of Khachmaz District Executive Power  
 Yagub Mahmudov -Director of the Institute of History of the Azerbaijan National Academy of Sciences (ANAS)

II Class 

 Suleyman Gasimov - Vice president of the State Oil Company of Azerbaijan (SOCAR)
 Khalik Mammadov - Vice president of the State Oil Company of Azerbaijan (SOCAR)
 Faig  Aghayev - Farmer, the village of Dudenga, Sharur district
 Ramil  Babayev - Farmer, village of Khindrystan, Agdam region
 Siragaddin  Jabbarov - Head of the Executive Authority of the Saatli region

III Class 

 Nail  Amirov - Chief engineer of the Baku Oil Refinery named after Heydar Aliyev
 Akber Feyzullayev - Doctor of Geological and Mineralogical Sciences, Full Member of the National Academy of Sciences of Azerbaijan
 Dashgin  Iskenderov - General Director of the Azneft Production Association
 Agil  Mammadov - Chief of the Militarized Rescue Unit for Fighting Fountains
 Aslan  Musayev - Honored Engineer of Azerbaijan
 Nazim  Veliyev - Head of the Department of Science and Technology, chairman of the trade union committee of the State Oil Company of Azerbaijan

See also 
Orders, decorations, and medals of Azerbaijan

References 

Orders, decorations, and medals of Azerbaijan
Awards established in 2016
2016 establishments in Azerbaijan